The  is a railway line in Kagoshima Prefecture, Japan, operated by the Kyushu Railway Company (JR Kyushu). It connects Kagoshima-Chūō Station in Kagoshima, to Makurazaki Station in Makurazaki, paralleling the eastern and southern coasts of Satsuma Peninsula. Excluding the Okinawa Urban Monorail in Okinawa, this is the southernmost JR railway line in Japan, with Nishi-Ōyama Station being the southernmost station overall.

Services
Most local and rapid services are driver-only operated; only some trains in the morning are staffed by a conductor. There are also trains that continue onwards to Kagoshima Station on the Kagoshima Main Line; once in the morning and twice in the evening.

The line is operationally divided into two sections. The section between Kagoshima-Chūō and Yamakawa functions as one of Kagoshima's commuter rail lines. As such, there are relatively many local trains. From Kagoshima-Chūō, there is roughly one train per 20 minutes to Goino, one every 20 to 40 minutes to Kiire, and one per one hour to Ibusuki or Yamakawa. After the timetable change in March 2017, the shortest interval between trains on the line is 6 minutes, at Kiire Station.

The Ibusuki no Tamatebako limited express and  rapid services operate on this section. The limited express train runs three times a day, and the rapid train runs three times a day southbound, four times a day northbound.

The section between Yamakawa and Makurazaki is an extremely quiet local line. During the daytime, there is no train service for six hours. In this section, all but Nishi-Ei are unmanned stations, including Makurazaki, the terminus.

The  rapid service was discontinued from the start of the revised timetable on March 12, 2011.

Stations
The Ibusuki Makurazaki Line is entirely in Kagoshima Prefecture.

Note': All trains stop at stations marked "+". Some trains stop at "*". No trains stop at "-".

History
The  Nishi-Kagoshima (now Kagoshima-Chūō) to Goino section opened in 1930, and was extended  to Ibusuki in 1934, and a further  to Yamakawa in 1936. The next  extension to Nishi-Ei opened in 1960 as a passenger only line, and Makurazaki (a further ) was reached in 1963.

Steam locomotives were withdrawn in 1973, and freight services in 1980. CTC signalling was commissioned between Nishi-Kagoshima and Yamakawa in 1983. Token signalling between Yamakawa and Makurazaki was abolished in 1994.

On June 21, 2014, a ten-metre cliff between Satsuma-Imaizumi and Nukumi collapsed. A Kagoshima-bound limited express train rode onto the debris caused by the collapse, resulting in the derailment of the first car. Out of 47 people on board, 13 passengers and two staff were injured; three were hospitalised. The section between Kiire and Ibusuki was then temporarily closed until June 28.

In July 2014, JR Kyushu raised the possibility of partially closing the Ibusuki Makurazaki Line due to consistent financial loss.

See also
List of railway lines in Japan

References

Lines of Kyushu Railway Company
Rail transport in Kagoshima Prefecture
1067 mm gauge railways in Japan